Jaroslav Eliáš (14 January 1906 – 1 March 1962) was a Czech athlete. He competed in the men's hammer throw at the 1936 Summer Olympics.

References

External links
 

1906 births
1962 deaths
Athletes (track and field) at the 1936 Summer Olympics
Czech male hammer throwers
Olympic athletes of Czechoslovakia
People from Kolín District
Sportspeople from the Central Bohemian Region